Rotimatic is an automated kitchen appliance that makes flatbread. It was invented by Indian-origin couple Pranoti Nagarkar and Rishi Israni in 2008.

Rotimatic uses machine learning to make bread and takes about a 90 seconds to make one roti. It was first shipped in 2016, and is currently available in twenty markets. As of October 2018, it has generated a revenue of US$40 million.

History 
Pranoti Nagarkar and Rishi Israni established their company ZImplistic Pte Ltd,. in Singapore with Rotimatic as their flagship product. The pre-order campaign started in 2014 and the product was delivered in 2016 and 2017 in Singapore and the United States respectively. As of April 2018, it is available in a total of 20 markets including the United Kingdom, Canada, Australia, New Zealand, and the United Arab Emirates.

As of October 2020, Zimplistic, has been acquired by Light Ray Holdings, a special-purpose vehicle incorporated in the British Virgin Islands. As of April 2021, more than 70,000 Rotimatics have been sold across 20 countries (45,000 units in the U.S.)

Inventor/Founder 
Rotimatic was invented by Indian-born Pranoti Nagarkar and Rishi Israni. Nagarkar is a mechanical engineer and Israni studied computer science. They are the Co-Founder of Zimplistic Pte Ltd., which was incorporated in Singapore in 2008. Rotimatic is the flagship product of their company. They are both alumni of National University of Singapore. They have more than 35 patents under their belt.

Investment 
By April 2018, Zimplistic, had raised around US$45 million through four rounds of venture funding. According to Zimplistic, Rotimatic generated a revenue of US$40 million in the fiscal year 2017-2018 by selling nearly 40,000 machines, with pre-order sales generating US$5 million.

Concept and design 
To make roti (or other types of flatbread such as tortillas and puris), the user adds portions of flour, water, oil, and any additional ingredients into designated compartments to top up pre stored containers if needed. After selecting the thickness, softness, and 1 or 2  drops of oil, the user presses a button, and the machine then makes dough, flattens it, and cooks the roti in 90 seconds. Rotimatic can bake around 20 rotis starting from full compartments.

Rotimatic uses machine learning so each machine takes some time to make good bread; they are also connected to the internet for software upgrades. It takes about a minute to make one roti after the machine has been fully heated up which takes more than five minutes. Weighing around 18 kilograms and measuring 16 by 16 inches, it has 15 sensors, 10 motors, and 300 parts.

The worldwide retail price of Rotimatic as of April 2018 is US$999; a high end bread machine cost around $170 at that time. Rotimatic is manufactured in Malaysia.

Reception 
Mashable called Rotimatic the first robotic roti maker. It further added that Zimplistic claims that one Rotimatic roti costs roughly five cents. A store-bought roti would cost around 40 to 50 cents. Engadget referenced it as "the world's most expensive flatbread maker".

Awards and recognition 

 Best Kitchen Gadget by CES in 2016
 Best Consumer IoT Solution at 2020 IoT World Awards
 Open category winner at Start-Up@Singapore 2009

See also 
Convenience cooking
Domestic robot
List of home appliances
 Instant Pot
  Moley Robotics MK1

References

External links 

Consumer electronics